Tyringham Hall (/ˈtiːrɪŋəm/) is a Grade I listed stately home, originally designed by Sir John Soane in 1792. It is located in Tyringham near Newport Pagnell, Buckinghamshire, England.

Architecture
The house was built on the site of the original manor house by William Praed, with plans by Sir John Soane.

Later additions by Edwin Lutyens in 1924 include the Bathing Pavilion, Temple of Music and Rose Garden. Tyringham Hall stands in Lutyens’ formally laid-out gardens, with a tree-lined drive leading past the deer park to a gravel sweep in front of the house. The façade features stone columns with sphinxes on either side of the entrance porch leading to the reception rooms. The Temple of Music had a Welte-Philharmonic Organ.

Ownership
During the 1970s, Tyringham Hall was the headquarters of the General Osteopathic Council of the UK.

In 2001 Tyringham Hall was purchased by real estate heir Anton Bilton (grandson of prefabricated housing tycoon Percy Bilton) and his wife Lisa Barbuscia-Bilton. Since 2004 they have invested around £10 million in renovating Tyringham Hall.

The house was put up for sale in May 2013 with an asking price of £18 million.

References

External links 

Country houses in Buckinghamshire
John Soane buildings
Houses completed in 1792
Grade I listed buildings in Buckinghamshire
Grade I listed houses
Gardens in Buckinghamshire
Works of Edwin Lutyens in England
Konig family
Tyringham